The 1967 Soviet football championship was the 35th seasons of competitive football in the Soviet Union and the 29th among teams of sports societies and factories. Dinamo Kiev won the championship becoming the Soviet domestic champions for the third time and the third team to do it back-to-back.

Honours

Notes = Number in parentheses is the times that club has won that honour. * indicates new record for competition

Soviet Union football championship

Class A First Group

Class A Second Group finals

For places 1-3
 [Oct 27 – Nov 16]

Additional Final
 [Nov 21, Tashkent]
 Dinamo Kirovabad  1-0  Shakhtyor Karaganda 
 Dinamo Kirovabad promoted.

For places 4-6
 [Oct 27 – Nov 16]

Class B

Russian Federation finals

Final group
 [Nov 5-25, Makhachkala, Astrakhan]

Ukraine finals

 [Oct 24 – Nov 2, Severodonetsk, Kadiyevka]

Union republics finals
 [Nov 5, Chernigov]
 Neman Grodno  1-0  Polad Sumgait

Central Asia and Kazakhstan

Top goalscorers

Class A First Group
Mikhail Mustygin (Dinamo Minsk) – 19 goals

References

External links
 1967 Soviet football championship. RSSSF